Belvedere Records was an American independent record label founded by Hochschild, Kohn & Co., a department store located in Baltimore, Maryland in 1922. It released records by Ford Dabney’s Syncopated Orchestra, W. C. Handy's Memphis Blues Band and the Original Memphis Five.

See also
 List of record labels

External links
 Mainspring Press

Record labels established in 1922
Defunct record labels of the United States
Blues record labels
Record labels based in Maryland